Yakushevo is a rural locality (a village) in Vyatkinskoye Rural Settlement, Sudogodsky District, Vladimir Oblast, Russia. The population was 3 as of 2010. There are 4 streets.

Geography 
Yakushevo is located 47 km northwest of Sudogda (the district's administrative centre) by road. Konyushino is the nearest rural locality.

References 

Rural localities in Sudogodsky District